"Round and Round" is a song by American heavy metal band Ratt from their 1984 album Out of the Cellar. It was released as a single in 1984 on Atlantic Records.

Musical style
The song's style has been widely described as glam metal.

Music video
In the song's music video, Milton Berle (uncle of Ratt manager Marshall Berle) plays both the staid head-of-household as well as the family matron (echoing his famous cross-dressing stunts of the 1950s). Both characters seem perturbed by the loud volume of Ratt's playing, and quickly leave the table. 

Meanwhile, a seemingly shy yet attractive young woman (played by Lisa Dean, who would later turn up in the video for Michael Jackson's "Dirty Diana") is drawn by the music to the attic. On the way upstairs to the attic, her dress and wig fall off, and she gives herself a makeover. The woman appears in the attic as a completely different person, and begins dancing to the song. 

At the end of the video, the butler is  dressed as a metalhead and excitedly dancing to the music in a separate room.

The song's video was placed on New York Times list of the 15 Essential Hair-Metal Videos.

Reception
"Round and Round"  is Ratt's biggest hit single, reaching No. 12 on the Billboard Hot 100 in 1984. The tune was ranked number 51 on VH1: 100 Greatest Songs of the '80s and was named the 61st best hard rock song of all time also by VH1.

In popular culture 
"Round and Round" was used in season 1 of the series Supernatural and season 2 of the Netflix series Stranger Things.
It was used during season 1 of Cobra Kai. The song was also used in the end credits for Billy & Mandy Save Christmas and in the 2008 film The Wrestler.  It was also featured in the rhythm video game Guitar Hero Encore: Rocks the 80s as a cover, and as a master recording in Guitar Hero Smash Hits and Rock Band 2. It was also featured in GTA Vice City Stories in Radio Station V-Rock

In a 2020 TV commercial for GEICO, a young couple explains their new home has a Ratt problem—not a rat problem, as would be a much more likely complaint for homeowners. The band is seen singing "Round and Round" in various parts of the house. The song charted again, reaching #18 on the Billboard Rock Digital Song Sales Chart on June 4, 2020.

Track listing
 "Round and Round" – 4:22
 "The Morning After" – 3:33

Personnel

RATT 
Stephen Pearcy – vocals
 Warren DeMartini – lead guitar
 Robbin Crosby – rhythm guitar
 Juan Croucier – bass guitar and backing vocals
 Bobby Blotzer – drums

Charts

Year-end charts

References

1984 singles
1984 songs
Atlantic Records singles
Ratt songs
Song recordings produced by Beau Hill
Songs written by Robbin Crosby
Songs written by Stephen Pearcy
Songs written by Warren DeMartini